Luftflotte 1 (Air Fleet 1) was one of the primary divisions of the German Luftwaffe in World War II. It was formed 1 February 1939 from Luftwaffengruppenkommando 1 in Berlin. This Luftwaffe detachment served in Estonia, Latvia, Lithuania and Immola, Finland, for air support of Axis forces in area; with command offices in Malpils, Latvia, (26 June 1944), Eastern front.

Units under Command

Strategic Reconnaissance
Stab/FAGr 1 (Riga–Spilve)
3.(F)/22 (Riga–Spilve)
5.(F)/122 (Mitau)
NASt 3 (Riga–Spilve)

Maritime Reconnaissance
1./SAGr 127 (Reval–Ülemiste)

Transports
1./TGr 10(Ital.) (Riga–Spilve)

Transports (special works)
This unit was branch of KG 200 with bases in East Prussia, Kurland and Baltic areas, stay equipped with:
 Junkers Ju 252A-1
 Junkers Ju 352A-0/A-1 Herkules
 Arado Ar 232B-0 Tausendfüßler for transport special commandos, weapons, vehicles or dropping by parachute secret agents in clandestine missions behind enemy lines.
 I.(TGr.)/KG 200 (Riga)

Bombers
 14.(Eis)/KG 55 (Jakobstadt)

3.Fliegerdivision (3°Air Division) Petseri

Tactical Reconnaissance
 Stab//NAGr 5 (Petseri)
 1./NAGr 5 (Idriza)
 1./NAGr 31 (Wesemberg)

Land Air Strike
I/SG 3 (Jakobstadt)

Night land strike
Stab/NSGr 1 (Idriza)
3./NSGr 1 (Idriza)
1./NSGr 1 (Kaunas)
2./NSGr 1 (Kaunas)
Stab/NSGr 3 (Vecuci)
1./NSGr 3 (Vecuci)
2./NSGr 3 (Vecuci)
1./NSGr 12 (Vecuci)
1./(Detach)NSGr 12(Riga–Spilve)
Stab/NSGr 11 (Rahkla)
1./NSGr 11 (Rahkla)
2./NSGr 11 (Rahkla)
2./NSG 12 (Libau)

Jagdabschnittführer Ostland (Fighter direction in Ostland) Riga-Spilve

Fighters
Stab/JG 54 (Dorpat)
I./JG 54 (Turku) (Finland)
2./JG 54 (Reval–Laksberg)
3./JG 54 (Reval–Laksberg)

Gefechtsverband Kuhlmey (Kuhlmey Combat Unit) Immola

Tactical Reconnaissance
1./NAGr 5 (Immola)

Fighters
II./JG 54 (Immola)

Land Air Strike
Stab/SG 3 (Immola)
1./SG 3 (Immola)
2./SG 3 (Immola)
3./SG 3 (Immola)

Commanding officers
Generalfeldmarschall Albert Kesselring, 1 February 1939 – 11 January 1940
Generaloberst Hans-Jürgen Stumpff, 12 January 1940 – 10 May 1940
General Wilhelm Wimmer, 11 May 1940 – 19 August 1940
Generaloberst Alfred Keller, 20 August 1940 – 12 June 1943
Generaloberst Günther Korten, 12 June 1943 – 23 August 1943
General Kurt Pflugbeil, 24 August 1943 – 16 April 1945

Chief of staff
Generalmajor Wilhelm Speidel, 1 February 1939 – 19 December 1939
Generalleutnant Ulrich Kessler, 19 December 1939 – 25 April 1940
Oberst Heinz-Hellmuth von Wühlisch, 1 May 1940 – 9 May 1940
Generalmajor Dr. Robert Knauss, 9 May 1940 – 4 October 1940
Generalmajor Otto Schöbel, 5 October 1940 – 16 January 1941
Generalmajor Heinz-Hellmuth von Wühlisch, 16 January 1941 – 13 October 1941
Generalmajor Herbert Rieckhoff, 13 October 1941 – 23 February 1943
Generalmajor Hans Detlef Herhudt von Rohden, 23 February 1943 – 24 August 1943
Generalmajor Klaus Uebe, 25 August 1943 – 24 December 1944
Oberstleutnant Paul-Werner Hozzel, 25 December 1944 – 16 April 1945

Subordinated units

II, III/Kampfgeschwader 1 "Hindenburg" (Ju 88A)
Kampfgeschwader 76 (Ju 88A)
Kampfgeschwader 77 (Ju 88A)
K.Fl.Gr. 806 (Ju 88A)
Jagdgeschwader 54 (Bf 109F)
2(F) Ob.d.L. (Do 215B)
5(F) 122 (Ju 88D)
eleven squadrons of (Hs 126)
SAGr 125 (Ar 95, Ar 196, He 114)
one transport squadron (Ju 52)
five liaison squadrons (Fi 156)
IV. Flakkorps (anti-aircraft artillery)
2. Flak-Division
6. Flak-Division

Abbreviations
 FAGr = Fernaufklärungsgruppe = Reconnaissance aircraft.
 Gruppe = equivalent to a RAF Wing.
 JG = Jagdgeschwader = Fighters.
 Geschwader = equivalent to a Royal Air Force Group.
 KG = Kampfgeschwader = Bombers.
 KG zbV = Kampfgeschwader zur besonderen Verwendung = Transport aircraft, later TG.
 NAGr = Nahaufklärungsgruppe = Observation aircraft.
 NASt = Nahaufklärungsstaffel = Observation aircraft.
 Staffel = equivalent to a RAF Squadron.
 NSGr = Nachtschlachtgruppe = Night ground attack.
 SAGr = Seeaufklärungsgruppe = Maritime patrol aircraft
 SG = Schlachtgeschwader = Ground attack.
 TG = Transportgeschwader= Transport aircraft.

References
Notes

References

 Luftflotte 1 @ Lexikon der Wehrmacht
 Luftflotte 1 @ The Luftwaffe, 1933-45

German Air Fleets in World War II
Military units and formations established in 1939
Military units and formations disestablished in 1945